The Vatican Climate Forest, to be located in the Bükk National Park, Hungary, was donated to the Vatican City by a carbon offsetting company. The forest is to be sized to offset the carbon emissions generated by the Vatican during 2007. The Vatican's acceptance of the offer, at a ceremony on July 5, 2007, was reported as being "purely symbolic", and a way to encourage Catholics to do more to safeguard the planet. No trees have been planted under the project and the carbon offsets have not materialized.

In a more effective move to combat global warming, in May 2007, the Vatican announced that the roof of the Paul VI Audience Hall would be covered with photovoltaic panels. The installation was officially placed into service on November 26, 2008.

See also 

Action on Climate Change
Avoiding dangerous climate change
Carbon footprint
Carbon neutrality
Kyoto Protocol
Index of Vatican City-related articles

References

External links 
Planktos/KlimaFa press release
Cardinal Poupard's acceptance speech
 Carbon Discredit no trees have been planted

Religious action on climate change
Environment of Vatican City